Harlem Heights may refer to:

Harlem Heights, Florida
Morningside Heights, Manhattan
Harlem Heights (TV series), reality docu-drama series on BET

See also
Battle of Harlem Heights, American Revolutionary War battle